Langley Hall is a Grade I listed country house in Norfolk, UK.

Langley Hall may also refer to:

Buildings
 Langley Hall (Bendigo), Victoria, Australia
 Langley Hall, Cheshire, England
 Langley Hall, East Berkshire College, Berkshire, UK
 Langley Hall, West Midlands, Warwickshire, UK
 Langley Hall (University of Pittsburgh), Pittsburgh, US

Other uses
 Dawn Langley Simmons (born Gordon Langley Hall, 1922–2000), English author

Architectural disambiguation pages